Portrait of Pietro Bembo, also called Portrait of the Young Pietro Bembo, is an oil painting by Italian artist Raphael. Completed ca. 1504, the painting hangs in the  Museum of Fine Arts in Budapest.

The image is ostensibly a portrait of Venetian Cardinal Pietro Bembo, Raphael's long-time friend. Raphael did make a black chalk drawing of Bembo during Bembo's visit to Urbino in 1506. The picture hung in Bembo's home for years before it disappeared.

The lack of resemblance of this picture to its namesake, particularly in the nose, has led to other subjects being proposed, including Agnolo Doni, whom Raphael  painted around the same time. In a 2004 biography of Bembo, Carol Kidwell states that the subject "appears a happy courtier, not a man set on making his mark in the world, and he wears a red beret while Venetian noblemen wore black."

See also
List of paintings by Raphael

Notes

References

External links
 

Pietro
1504 paintings
Paintings in the collection of the Museum of Fine Arts (Budapest)